Poggiale is a French-Italian name derived as a diminutive form of Italian poggio for hill. 

 Antoine Baudoin Poggiale (1808–1879), French chemist
 San Giorgio in Poggiale, Bologna

See also
 Poggiali, a surname